The Maelor School, Penley (Welsh: Ysgol Maelor) is a mixed comprehensive school situated in the village of Penley, Wrexham County Borough, in north-east Wales. As of February 2008, the school had a total of 794 pupils aged 11–18 of whom 138 students are in the sixth form.

History
The Maelor school was established in 1957 within the English Maelor area, then within the county of Flintshire, in the village of Penley (Welsh: Llanerch Banna) to serve the needs of the rural communities surrounding it

Prior to the school being built, there were originally proposals to build an open prison on the land. However, this was met by a lot of opposition from the surrounding communities and eventually the proposals were over-ruled and the decision was made to build a school instead. The school cost £93,000 to build and originally accommodated 240 pupils. The school consisted of six classrooms, stores, a handicraft room, a science laboratory, a kitchen, a general practical room, a library, a gymnasium, changing rooms, cloakrooms, offices, staff rooms, and an assembly hall complete with a stage. The school sat in nine acres of grounds, complete with three tennis courts, a large concrete drill area, and provision for two soccer pitches, two hockey pitches and two cricket pitches. The school was officially opened on 6 November 1957 by Dowager Lady Kenyon.

The Badge
The school's badge was designed by two of the school's original staff. The bird, a chough from the Flintshire coat of arms, symbolises the school's historical link with the county, going back to the thirteenth century. The sheaf of wheat from the Cheshire flag symbolises the region's agricultural background and also references its link with that county of which it was once a part in antiquity. The two blue lions, those of Hanmer, represent the Maelor's historic families as well as Sir Edward Hanmer's interest in the school. The red chevron represents the Maelor's separation from the rest of the county and the black crosses symbolise the Maelor's contributory parishes and townships.

Academia 
The school follows the standard curriculum of GCSEs and A-Levels.

Most recently, in 2009, 99% of the school's year eleven students achieved five or more GCSEs with 84% of students passing the equivalent of five or more GCSEs (A*-C grade) and 98% achieving eight or more passes. The school's sixth form students achieved an average of three hundred and five points in their AS/A-Level exams, five points over the school's target of three hundred points (the equivalent of three B grades).[1]

In 2006 the school was named the "most improved secondary school in North Wales" from the Curriculum Authority for Wales in 2006.[1]

During 2014 The Daily Post ranked The Maelor School as the 6th best school in North Wales out of 3,079

In January 2015 The Maelor School was confirmed as achieving the highest grades in Wales for pupils who receive free school meals

Facilities and development 

Library – the school's library recently underwent a refurbishment in order to update existing facilities. It is now used for individual/group study, whole class use, individual/group research, word-processing, internet access, and recreational reading. Resources found in the library include computers all with internet access and word processing capabilities, and a listening station.
Swimming pool – located to the west of the main building within school grounds, the pool is used to host swimming galas and other swimming competitions as well as being used for swimming lessons both during and after school hours.
Tennis Courts - the school has three tennis courts situated next to the swimming pool and the school field.
Conference Room - a recent addition to the school, this room can be used by staff and students to communicate via video and microphone using new technology.
Computing Facilities – the school also has an extensive up to date computer network. All computers run on Windows 10. Pupils are given accounts with which they can access the internet and create and save their own documents.
Sports Hall – From 2009 the school has constructed a large Sports hall used by students during school hours, with 2 changing rooms, a dance hall and a large sports area containing two basketball courts.
F Block - Opened in the new school year in 2021, it provides four new modern classrooms for the humanities department.

Extra-curricular activities 
The school's pupils engage in a wide range of extra-curricular activities, including sports, music and drama, as well as educational trips abroad and the Duke of Edinburgh's Award scheme. The school has several clubs and societies which aim to widen and develop the interests of pupils.

Such extra curricular activities include:
Sport - Students can participate in a number of different sports including athletics, football, gymnastics, badminton, tennis, rounders, netball, basketball and swimming. Marion Edwards is the current holder of the School's 'Victrix Ludorum' award
Languages - In recent years the school has taught Japanese, French, German, Finnish and Zulu.
Music - Students at the school have the opportunity to get involved with the music department. Individual artists, ensembles and the school's wind band, orchestra and choir frequently perform both in school and further afield. Highlights include performances in a nationwide broadcast on the BBC's Music Live festival in June 2000 and performing at the Royal Albert Hall. The school's string orchestra took part in the final of the national Music for Youth competition at the Royal Festival Hall in July 2003 and in 2006 they competed in the same competition at the Birmingham Symphony Hall, England. A number of soloists also competed in the finals of the Urdd Eisteddfod competition with one going on to win the competition in her class.
Drama - The school has put on several productions including 'Aladdin: A Wok 'n' Roll Tale', 'Fiddler On The Roof', 'Oliver' and 'Jack and the Beanstalk'.
Peer Education - In recent years, the school has participated in Wrexham County Borough Council's Peer Education scheme where pupils attend a training course enabling them to teach their peers about issues such as drugs, smoking and alcohol. Educators then run sessions in the school's annual 'Health Days' and those who show dedication can go on to attain an OCN level three in related subjects, the highest qualification below a degree.
Duke of Edinburgh's Award – the school encourages students to take part in the Duke of Edinburgh's Award scheme and students have to opportunity to complete their Bronze, Silver and Gold awards during their time at the school.
Young Enterprise The school is also a supporter of the Young Enterprise scheme.
School Council - the Maelor School Student Council has representatives from all year groups who discuss a wide range of issues and concerns, ideas from which are put to the headmaster for consideration.
Solo Ultimate Frisbee – The Maelor School Sixth Form actively encourages its students to compete in Frisbee. This scheme has been in place since 2013 with a small number of students competing between themselves. By the end of the 2015 year it had become a craze which consumed a large number of the Sixth Form.

Most activities take place during lunchtime but other pursuits, such as band rehearsals and sporting events take place after school and during the weekends.

Students can also take part in trips abroad offered by the humanities, physics and physical education departments. Past destinations have included, Geneva, France and Spain. Longer term expeditions are also becoming common, with past destinations including Peru, Zambia and Botswana.

Notable alumni

 Tim Vincent Media (Most known for Blue Peter)

References

External Sources 
 The Maelor School

Secondary schools in Wrexham County Borough
Educational institutions established in 1957
1957 establishments in Wales